The 2008–09 A1 Grand Prix of Nations, China was an A1 Grand Prix race, held at Chengdu Goldenport Circuit, Chengdu, People's Republic of China.

All proceeds from this race were donated to the Sichuan Earthquake Relief Fund, following the earthquake which devastated the region in May 2008.

Drivers 
After missing the first race due to a lack of cars, A1 Teams Great Britain, India and Mexico took part in this race. Both A1 Team Pakistan and A1 Team Germany will not make their season debut until the fourth round at Taupo. Team Pakistan require more changes to their chassis to render it suitable for their lead driver Adam Khan, while Team Germany is undergoing management restructuring.

The status of A1 Team Canada was not announced, but they were removed from the race's drivers list on the A1GP website front page, and did not make an appearance. Their status for future events is still unknown.

↑ Karthikeyan and Andretti were granted special dispensation to participate in the rookie session as neither team had completed as many testing miles as the other teams with the new car.  Karthikeyan (F1) and Andretti (IRL ICS) are veteran drivers in one of the four series (F1, GP2, FN, IRL-ICS) which their drivers may not compete as A1GP rookies.

Qualifying 
Due to a delay in recovering the  Italian car after spinning into a gravel trap during the first qualifying session, the second qualifying session was cancelled, meaning all times from Q1 set the field for Q1, with  Ireland taking their first ever pole position, ahead of  The Netherlands and  Switzerland.

Q4 was stopped briefly after a spin for  France. The session was resumed with teams able to make a run in time. Danny Watts for  Great Britain took pole ahead of  Ireland and  Portugal.

Sprint Race 
For safety reasons, a pit stop was not required for the Sprint Race. In lap 2,  Brazil is slowing and the Safety car is on while Felipe Guimarães reach the pits. In the same lap 2,  China spun and lost some positions but finally catch up and pass  Korea on lap 7. when the Safety car is out, the order was  Ireland,  Netherlands,  Great Britain,  Switzerland,  South Africa,  Portugal,  New Zealand and  France. Those positions remain until the end of the race with the fastest lap for  Adam Carroll.

Feature Race 
The second pit-stop window for the Feature Race was set for Laps 24–32.

Notes 
 It was the 34th race weekend (68 starts).
 It was the 6th race in China, and the first at Chengdu Goldenport Circuit.
 It was the first race weekend as main driver for  Marco Andretti,  Robert Doornbos,  Nicolas Prost,  Chris van der Drift and  Danny Watts.
 It was the first race weekend as rookie driver for  Zahir Ali,  Christian Montanari and  Dennis Retera.
 Records:
 Adam Carroll, Danny Watts, and  Ireland scored their first pole position.
 Filipe Albuquerque and  Portugal scored their first victory.
 Adam Carroll and  Ireland scored their first Sprint Race victory.

References

External links
Oh Danny boy! (Qualifying analysis)
Ireland bounces back in Chengdu
Sprint race: as it happened
Sprint race results
Portugal storms to first victory
Feature race: as it happened
Feature race results

A1 Grand Prix Of Nations, China, 2008-09
A1 Grand Prix Of Nations, China, 2008-09
Auto races in China